Dominik Kopeć (pronounced ; born 5 March 1995) is a Polish sprinter. He finished fifth at the 2015 European U23 Championships in Tallinn.

International competitions

Personal bests
Outdoor
100 metres – 10.20 (+0.5 m/s, Suwałki  2022)
200 metres – 20.59 (+0.9 m/s, Szczecin 2018)
Indoor
60 metres – 6.53 (Istanbul 2023)
200 metres – 21.17 (Toruń 2018)

References

1995 births
Living people
Polish male sprinters
People from Tomaszów Lubelski County
Polish Athletics Championships winners
European Athletics Championships medalists
21st-century Polish people